Shughni or Khughni (in the local language:  tr. ; Tajik:), is one of the Pamir languages of the Southeastern Iranian language group. Its distribution is in the Gorno-Badakhshan Autonomous Region in Tajikistan, Badakhshan Province in Afghanistan, Chitral district in Pakistan and Taxkorgan Tajik Autonomous County in China.

Shughni-Rushani tends towards SOV word order, distinguishes a masculine and feminine gender in nouns and some adjectives, as well as the 3rd person singular of verbs. Shughni distinguishes between an absolutive and an oblique case in its system of pronouns. Rushani is noted for a typologically unusual 'double-oblique' construction, also called a 'transitive case', in the past tense. Normally Soviet school scientists consider Rushani as a close but independent language to Shughni, while Western school scientists codes Rushani as a dialect of Shughni due to Afghanistan Rushani speakers living in the Sheghnan district of Badakhshan Province.

Dialects
Rushani, Bartangi, Oroshori (Roshorvi), Khufi and Shughni proper are considered to be dialects. However, Bartangi and Khufi are quite distinct and may be separate languages.

Phonology

Vowels
The following are the vowels of Shughni:

Long vowels occur as /, /.

Consonants 
The following are the consonants of Shughni:

 /r/ can be realised as a trill [r] or a tap [ɾ].
 Velar sounds /x, ɣ/ can also be realised as more fronted palatal sounds [ç, ʝ].

Vocabulary

Orthography

Cyrillic alphabet
The Shughni cyrillic alphabet is as follows:

Literature
Zarubin, I.I. Shugnanskie teksty i slovar. Moskva : Izd-vo Akademii nauk SSSR, 1960.
Džoy I. Edelman and Leila R. Dodykhudoeva (2009). Shughni. In Gernot Windfuhr (ed.), The Iranian Languages, 787-824. London & New York: Routledge.
Olson, Karen (2017). Shughni Phonology Statement. SIL International.

References

External links

 Shughni Language Page
 The Shughni Grammar Project
 Shughni Wikipedia main page

Pamir languages
Eastern Iranian languages
Languages of Tajikistan
Pamir languages of Afghanistan
Endangered Iranian languages
Languages of Khyber Pakhtunkhwa
Languages of Chitral